Lucio Corsi (born 15 October 1993) is an Italian singer-songwriter.

Biography
Born in Grosseto, he raised in Vetulonia and moved to Milan after his graduation at liceo scientifico in 2012.

He released his debut EP Vetulonia Dakar in 2014 and signed with Picicca Dischi in the same year. In 2015 he released his second play Altalena Boy; both EPs were reprinted in a studio album titled Altalena Boy/Vetulonia Dakar on 16 January 2015, distributed by Sony Music.

His second album Bestiario musicale – a concept album about the animals from his homeland Maremma – was released on 27 January 2017 by Picicca Dischi. He also posed as model for Gucci's "Cruise 2018" campaign in Palazzo Pitti on 29 May 2017, and took part in the "Gucci Roman Rhapsody" project by stylist Alessandro Michele and photographer Mick Rock.

He signed with Sugar Music in 2019 and released his third studio album Cosa faremo da grandi? on 17 January 2020.

Discography

Studio albums 
 Altalena Boy/Vetulonia Dakar (2015)
 Bestiario musicale (2017)
 Cosa faremo da grandi? (2020)

Extended plays 
 Vetulonia Dakar (2014)
 Altalena Boy (2015)

Singles 
 "Cosa faremo da grandi?" (2019)
 "Freccia Bianca" (2020)
 "Trieste" (2020)
 "Astronave giradisco/La bocca della verità" (2023)

Other appearances 
 "Il cuore va nell'organico" – Khabum feat. Margherita Vicario and Lucio Corsi (2016)

Music videos 
 Le api (2014), directed by Lucio Corsi
 Søren (2014), directed by Lucio Corsi
 Migrazione generale dalle campagne alle città (2014), directed by Tommaso Ottomano
 Godzilla (2014), directed by Tommaso Ottomano
 Altalena Boy (versione "tranquilla") (2015), directed by Tommaso Ottomano
 Altalena Boy (versione "sgravata") (2015), directed by Tommaso Ottomano
 Cosa faremo da grandi? (2019), directed by Tommaso Ottomano
 Freccia Bianca (2020), directed by Tommaso Ottomano
 Trieste (2020), directed by Tommaso Ottomano

References

External links 
 
 

Italian male singer-songwriters
Italian pop singers
Living people
21st-century Italian male  singers
1993 births
People from Grosseto